Nurabad (also Romanized as Nūrābād and Noor Abad) is a village in Koshksaray Rural District, in the Central District of Marand County, East Azerbaijan Province, Iran. At the 2006 census, its population was 106, in 34 families.

References 

Populated places in Marand County